Paddy O'Flaherty (born 1933) is an Irish retired Gaelic footballer who played for club side Beann Eadair and at inter-county level with the Dublin senior football team.

Career

A member of the Beann Eadair club, O'Flaherty first came to prominence in 1954 when he was drafted onto the Dublin senior team. Within 12 months he had secured his first Leinster Championship medal, while he also lined out in the 1955 All-Ireland final defeat by Kerry. O'Flaherty won three provincial titles in total and lined out in goal for Dublin's 1958 All-Ireland final defeat of Derry.

Honours

Dublin
All-Ireland Senior Football Championship: 1958
Leinster Senior Football Championship: 1955, 1958, 1959
National Football League: 1954-55, 1957-58

References

1933 births
Living people
Dublin inter-county Gaelic footballers
Gaelic football goalkeepers